Rhode Island elected its two members at-large on separate tickets.

See also 
 List of United States representatives from Rhode Island

References 

1794
Rhode Island
United States House of Representatives